Puppy chow, also known as monkey munch, muddy buddies, muddy munch, reindeer chow, or doggy bag, is the name for a homemade candy made in the United States, primarily in midwestern states. The recipe's name and ingredients can differ depending on the version, but most recipes will typically include cereal, melted chocolate, peanut butter (or other nut butters), and powdered sugar. Nut free versions can be made using nut butter alternatives, like Notnuts or sun butter. Cereals used in the recipes are usually Chex and/or Crispix.   The true origins of the candy are not known.

Many tend to make the candy during special events such as holidays and gaming. It is a popular candy to make for children and adults alike.

General Mills has made their own version of the candy, which they began selling under the name of Chex Mix Muddy Buddies in 2010, and it has been popular under that name in certain parts of the country since at least the 1980s.

References

Snack foods
Cuisine of the Midwestern United States
Christmas food